Víctor Julio Rodolfo Balta Mori (born 3 January 1986) is a Peruvian footballer who plays as a center back for Sport Huancayo in the Peruvian Primera División.

Balta began his playing career in 2006 with Universitario de Deportes where he won two championships with the team.

Honours

Club
Universitario de Deportes
 Apertura: 2008
 Torneo Descentralizado (1): 2009

External links
 
 
 

1986 births
Living people
People from Iquitos
Association football central defenders
Peruvian footballers
Club Universitario de Deportes footballers
Juan Aurich footballers
FBC Melgar footballers
León de Huánuco footballers
Peruvian Primera División players
Deportivo Binacional FC players